Dimethylsulfone reductase is an enzyme. This enzyme catalyses the following chemical reaction

 dimethyl sulfoxide + H2O + NAD+  dimethyl sulfone + NADH + H+

Dimethylsulfone reductase is a molybdoprotein.

References

External links 
 

EC 1.8.1